It's a King is a 1933 British comedy film directed by Jack Raymond and starring Sydney Howard, Joan Maude and Cecil Humphreys. It was made at Elstree Studios by the producer Herbert Wilcox's British and Dominions company.

Plot
Farce in which insurance agent Albert King is discovered to be the exact double of the king of Helgia, and even has his name in reverse (King Albert). Insurance man Albert enjoys a romance with a princess, before finally saving the King from assassination by anarchists.

Cast
 Sydney Howard as Albert King / King Albert  
 Joan Maude as Princess Yasma  
 Cecil Humphreys as Count Yendoff  
 George De Warfaz as Colonel Brandt  
 Arthur Goullet as Leader  
 Franklyn Bellamy as Salvatore 
 Bela Berkes as himself  
 Lew Stone as himself

References

Bibliography
 Low, Rachael. Filmmaking in 1930s Britain. George Allen & Unwin, 1985.
 Wood, Linda. British Films, 1927-1939. British Film Institute, 1986.

External links

1933 films
British comedy films
1933 comedy films
1930s English-language films
Films directed by Jack Raymond
British and Dominions Studios films
Films shot at Imperial Studios, Elstree
British black-and-white films
1930s British films